Elsa Guðbjörg Vilmundardóttir (27 November 1932 - 2008) was the first Icelandic woman to complete a degree in geology and was the country's first female geologist. But she did much more outside of the field of geology, and was very involved in her community.  She was a co-founder of the Icelandic Earth Association, being its chair for four years.

Life
Elsa Guðbjörg Vilmundardóttir was born in the Vestmannaeyjar. Her parents were Vilmundur Guðmundsson, an engineer from Hafnarnes, Reyðarfjörður (1907–34) and Gudrun Björnsdóttir, a seamstress (1903–75). At the age of three, Elsa moved with her parents from the islands to Siglufjörður; her father drowned shortly thereafter. She then moved in with her maternal grandparents and at the age of 12, she moved to her mother's home in Reykjavík. Elsa was married to her husband Pálmi, and had two children Guðrún Lára, and Vilmundur. Elsa died at Landspítali - University Hospital in Fossvogur on 23 April 2008 after becoming sickly a few hours prior during a conference. Her funeral took place at Áskirkja on 7 May.

Elsa graduated from Menntaskólinn í Reykjavík in 1953. In 1958, she went to Sweden and enrolled at Stockholm University. She studied geology from 1958 to 1963. During her university years, she did geological fieldwork in the summers on behalf of Electricity Department, mostly through geological research of the proposed Búrfellsvirkjun hydropower plant. Her interest quickly focused on the geology of Tungnáröræfa. After completing her studies in 1963, she returned home and began working at jobs at the Electricity Department, followed by the National Energy Authority (NEA) of Iceland, when it was formed in 1967, working there until she retired in 2004. In 1980, an agreement was made between the NEA and Landsvirkjun on uniform geological mapping and she was the supervisor of the project. Elsa's research also included mapping tuff and lava north of Vatnajökull, as well as pyroclastic flows associated with prehistoric Hekla eruptions. She wrote about scientific research and was the co-author of  100 Geosites in South-Iceland published in 2005 at the age of 73. During her life, Elsa specialized in tuff formation.

Career 
As her career began Elsa was self-employed working part time jobs within the years of 1963–1978 to support her family. Elsa was involved in various projects, starting at the Electrical Energy Office Agency in 1963, along with contractor work in Icelandic energy research. The majority of her projects involved the power plants in southern highlands and in Fljótsdalur.

Occupied in many organizations and active in a variety of social issues, Elsa was one of the founders of the Icelandic Earth Association, being its chair for four years. She was also the chair of the Energy Agency for two years. In addition, Elsa was a founder of the Health Circle, and vice chairman of the association for sixteen years (1982-1998). In this position she was often called when a speaker was needed. She wrote many articles to advance “Health Circle’s” cause, and regularly chaired the association's meetings. Elsa worked extensively on geological mapping, such as the mapping of lava and moss. She became the supervisor of a geologic mapping of the Þjórsá river basin, which was determined with a consensus between Orkustofnun and Landsvirkjun in 1980. A total of 21 maps were published from 1983 to 1999 in order to prepare for the bedrock, soil and water of the given area. Elsa was also on the board of the Kópavogur branch of the Red Cross, in 2002 she contributed to the board's decision to radically change the emphasis in the work and significantly strengthen voluntary work for the benefit of the community in Kópavogur. Elsa took an active part in the department's clothing sorting project in the capital area and was an assistant director. She sat on the department's emergency committee and was very interested in emergency prevention.

Research 
During her research, Elsa was focused on geological mapping. She would map the lava and tuff formations in the southern highlands. A coordinated geological mapping of the Þjórsá river area, which she was leading, was a collective project with the National Energy Authority and Landsvirkjun.

Elsa had worked in many parts of Iceland; however, she was drawn to the Southwest of Vatnajökull, where she carried out a majority of her research. It is important to note that Elsa's research tied into the workings of her career. While working at The Electricity Office, a predecessor of the National Energy Authority, she would have had ties to research into the Þjórsá river basin, which was one of the main projects of the office. In 1980, when development of geologic maps of the river basin began, Elsa spent both her working hours and vacation days to research into the landscape to further contribute to the creation of those maps. Later on in her career, Elsa had begun research into the eastern eruptive belt and their respective tuff images.

Elsa's research was primarily composed of the creation of various geological maps.

 “Journal of Quaternary Science.” Wiley Online Library, onlinelibrary.wiley.com/journal/10991417.
 Larsen, Gudrún, et al. “Geochemistry, Dispersal, Volumes and Chronology of Holocene Silicic Tephra Layers from the Katla Volcanic System, Iceland.” Wiley Online Library, John Wiley & Sons, Ltd, 27 Mar. 2001, onlinelibrary.wiley.com/doi/abs/10.1002/jqs.587.
 Mbl.is. “Elsa Guðbjörg Vilmundardóttir.” Mbl.is, Mbl.is, 11 May 2008, www.mbl.is/greinasafn/grein/1213707/.
 Vilmundardóttir, Elsa G, et al. “BERGFLOKKUN OG EÐLISMASSI AURS.” Orkunstofnun Geoscience Division, Gresásvegi 9, 108 Reykjavík, 1983
 Vilmundardóttir, Elsa G. “Berggrunnskort af Möðrudalsfjallgöorðum og nágrenni.” Orkustofnun Rannsóknasvið ,Grensásvegi 9, 108 Reykjavik, 1997.
 Vilmundardóttir, Elsa G, et al. “Borhole HH-01 Haukholt í Hreppum Geological report.” Orkustofnun Geoscience Division, Grensásvegi 9, 109 Reykjavík, 1999.
 Vilmundardóttir, Elsa G, et al. “Borhole LL-03 Laugalandi í Holtum Geological Report. .” Orkustofnun Geoscience Division, Grensásvegi 9, 108 Reykjavík, 1999.
 Vilmundardóttir, Elsa G, et al. “BÚÐARHÁLSVIRKJUN - Borhola ST-1: Setgreining.” Orkustofnun Raforkudeild, 1979.
 Vilmundardóttir, Elsa G, et al. “Frá Starfsemi Félagsins Starfsárið 1989-1990.” Jökull, vol. 40, no. 1, 1990, pp. Jökull, 1990–12-01, Vol.40 (1).
 Vilmundardóttir, Elsa G. et al. “Geochemistry, Dispersal, Volumes and Chronology of Holocene Silicic Tephra Layers from the Katla Volcanic System, Iceland.” Journal of Quaternary Science, vol. 16, no. 2, 2001, pp. 119–132.
 Vilmundardottir, E. G, and I Kaldal. “Holocene Sedimentary Sequence at Tràvidarlaekur Basin, Pjósàrdalur, Southern Iceland.” Jökull, 1 Jan. 1982, pascal-francis.inist.fr/vibad/index.php?action=getRecordDetail&idt=9339092.	
 Vilmundardóttir, Elsa G. et al. “Late Holocene (Ca. 4 Ka) Marine and Terrestrial Environmental Change in Reykjarfjördur, North Iceland: Climate and/Orsettlement?” Journal of Quaternary Science, vol. 16, no. 2, 2001, pp. 133–143.
 Vilmundardóttir, Elsa G, et al. “Veiðivötn: jarðfraeðikort.” Orkustofnun and Landsvirkjun, 1990. http://hdl.handle.net/10802/29024

See also
 Timeline of women in science

References

Sources
 “Elsa G. Vilmundardóttir Jarðfræðingur Er Látin.” ÍSOR, www.isor.is/frettir/elsa-g-vilmundardottir-jardfraedingur-er-latin.
 “Journal of Quaternary Science.” Wiley Online Library, onlinelibrary.wiley.com/journal/10991417.
 Larsen, Gudrún, et al. “Geochemistry, Dispersal, Volumes and Chronology of Holocene Silicic Tephra Layers from the Katla Volcanic System, Iceland.” Wiley Online Library, John Wiley & Sons, Ltd, 27 Mar. 2001, onlinelibrary.wiley.com/doi/abs/10.1002/jqs.587.
 Mbl.is. “Elsa Guðbjörg Vilmundardóttir.” Mbl.is, Mbl.is, 11 May 2008, www.mbl.is/greinasafn/grein/1213707/.
 Vilmundardóttir, Elsa G, et al. “BERGFLOKKUN OG EÐLISMASSI AURS.” Orkunstofnun Geoscience Division, Gresásvegi 9, 108 Reykjavík, 1983
 Vilmundardóttir, Elsa G. “Berggrunnskort af Möðrudalsfjallgöorðum og nágrenni.” Orkustofnun Rannsóknasvið ,Grensásvegi 9, 108 Reykjavik, 1997.
 Vilmundardóttir, Elsa G, et al. “Borhole HH-01 Haukholt í Hreppum Geological report.” Orkustofnun Geoscience Division, Grensásvegi 9, 109 Reykjavík, 1999.
 Vilmundardóttir, Elsa G, et al. “Borhole LL-03 Laugalandi í Holtum Geological Report. .” Orkustofnun Geoscience Division, Grensásvegi 9, 108 Reykjavík, 1999.
 Vilmundardóttir, Elsa G, et al. “BÚÐARHÁLSVIRKJUN - Borhola ST-1: Setgreining.” Orkustofnun Raforkudeild, 1979.
 Vilmundardóttir, Elsa G, et al. “Frá Starfsemi Félagsins Starfsárið 1989-1990.” Jökull, vol. 40, no. 1, 1990, pp. Jökull, 1990–12-01, Vol.40 (1).
 Vilmundardóttir, Elsa G. et al. “Geochemistry, Dispersal, Volumes and Chronology of Holocene Silicic Tephra Layers from the Katla Volcanic System, Iceland.” Journal of Quaternary Science, vol. 16, no. 2, 2001, pp. 119–132.
 Vilmundardottir, E. G, and I Kaldal. “Holocene Sedimentary Sequence at Tràvidarlaekur Basin, Pjósàrdalur, Southern Iceland.” Jökull, 1 Jan. 1982, pascal-francis.inist.fr/vibad/index.php?action=getRecordDetail&idt=9339092.	
 Vilmundardóttir, Elsa G. et al. “Late Holocene (Ca. 4 Ka) Marine and Terrestrial Environmental Change in Reykjarfjördur, North Iceland: Climate and/Orsettlement?” Journal of Quaternary Science, vol. 16, no. 2, 2001, pp. 133–143.
 Vilmundardóttir, Elsa G, et al. “Veiðivötn: jarðfraeðikort.” Orkustofnun and Landsvirkjun, 1990. http://hdl.handle.net/10802/29024

External links
 List of Elsa G. Vilmundardottir's scientific contributions

Vilmundardottir, Elsa G.
Vilmundardottir, Elsa G.
Icelandic geologists
Icelandic women scientists
Icelandic women writers
Icelandic writers
Vilmundardottir, Elsa G.
Vilmundardottir, Elsa G.
People from Vestmannaeyjar
20th-century Icelandic women writers
20th-century Icelandic writers
Vilmundardottir, Elsa G.
Vilmundardottir, Elsa G.
Vilmundardottir, Elsa G.